Count of Barcelos (in Portuguese Conde de Barcelos) is a title of nobility, the first to be granted in Portugal. It was created in 1298 by king Denis I and initially it was a non hereditary title, although most of the holders belonged to the Teles de Menezes family. It was only after the death of the 6th Count, when it was granted to Nuno Álvares Pereira, that the title became hereditary. The 8th Count of Barcelos was created Duke of Braganza in 1442, by his nephew king Afonso V, and his descendants rose to the Portuguese throne after the country regained its independence from Spain in 1640.

Initially, the seat of the Counts of Barcelos was the Castle of Barcelos, a large medieval structure that overlooks the Cávado river. After having been granted the Dukedom of Braganza, the family moved to a larger and more urbane palace in Guimarães.

The title is currently held by Duarte Pio, Duke of Braganza and 31st Count of Barcelos, claimant to the throne of Portugal.

List of the Counts of Barcelos

Non-hereditary title (1298) 
1. João Afonso Telo; 
2. Martim Gil de Riba de Vizela, also known as Martim Gil de Sousa (1st Count's son in law); 
3. Pedro Afonso, natural son of King Denis I of Portugal; 
4. João Afonso Telo, also 1st Count of Ourém;  
5. Afonso Teles de Meneses, 4th count's son. Since he died before his father, the title reverted to his father;
6. João Afonso Telo, 4th count's nephew, son of Martim Afonso Telo de Meneses, and also brother of Queen Leonor Teles.

Hereditary title (1385) 
7. Nuno Álvares Pereira
8. Afonso, also Duke of Braganza (1442), son in law of the 7th Count.

For the list of holders after this date, see Dukes of Braganza.

See also
 Duke of Barcelos

Bibliography
"Nobreza de Portugal e do Brasil" – Vol. II, pages 376-401. Published by Zairol Lda., Lisbon 1989.

Barcelos
Barcelos
1298 establishments in Europe
13th-century establishments in Portugal